Pascale Roze (born 1954 Saïgon, Vietnam) is a French playwright, and novelist.

After a literature degree, she worked for fifteen years with Gabriel Garran International French Theater.

Awards
 1996 Prix Goncourt and Prix du Premier Roman for the novel Le Chasseur Zéro

Works

Plays
 Mary contre Mary
 Tolstoï la Nuit, 1981, prix Arletty de l'auteur dramatique.

Novels
 Histoires dérangées, recueil de nouvelles, Julliard, 1994,  (LGF/Le Livre de Poche, 1998)
 Le Chasseur Zéro A. Michel, 1996, 
 Ferraille, Albin Michel, 1999
 Lettre d'été, Albin Michel, 2000
 Parle-moi, Albin Michel, 2003, 
 Un homme sans larmes, Stock, 2005, 
 L'Eau rouge, Gallimard, 2007, 
 Itsik, Stock, 2008

External links
"Author's website" 
"An Evening with Pascale Roze", ''Consulate General of France in Hong Kong

20th-century French dramatists and playwrights
1954 births
Living people
Prix Goncourt winners
Prix Maurice Genevoix winners
Prix du premier roman winners
People from Ho Chi Minh City
French women novelists
Women dramatists and playwrights
20th-century French women writers